Juvenil Los Ángeles is a Peruvian football club, playing in the city of Moquegua, Peru.

The club play in the Copa Perú which is the third division of the Peruvian league.

History
The club have played at the highest level of Peruvian football on three occasions, in 1987 Torneo Descentralizado and from 1990 Torneo Descentralizado until 1991 Torneo Descentralizado when was relegated.

Honours

Regional
Liga Departamental de Moquegua: 1
Winners (1): 1986

See also
List of football clubs in Peru
Peruvian football league system

References 

Football clubs in Peru
Association football clubs established in 1958
1958 establishments in Peru